Ich und meine Maske ("Me and my mask") is the third solo album by German rapper Sido. It was released on 30 May 2008 on his label Aggro Berlin. The style is, according to Sido, a mix between his two last albums, Maske and Ich.

The album climbed to first place in the German chart and to second place in the Swiss and Austrian Charts. It reached platinum status in Switzerland and gold status in Austria.

Guest appearances 
The album had many guest appearance of Sido's label mates Fler, Kitty Kat, Tony D and B-Tight. Sektenmuzik members Alpa Gun and Greckoe had there guest parts on "Schule", as well as Die Sekte on the track "Meine Gang". Rapper Harris, and one half of German hip hop duo Deine Lieblings Rapper, is featured on Tage, along with Pillath, one half of duo Snaga & Pillath.

The Premium Edition features a remix of "Halt dein Maul", with additional vocals of Kitty Kat, Willi Murda and rap duo Automatikk. The track "Ich bin so Gaga" featured Bass Sultan Hengzt.

Other artists including Doreen Steinert, Mario Barth, Joe Rilla and Azad are featured on the album. Azad, who was a former rival of Sido, had recorded with him the track "Pack schlägt sich", for showing that they officially had ended their feud.
German techno band Scooter produced the song "Beweg dein Arsch", that samples their "Move Your Ass!".

"Augen auf", the album's first single, was the 72nd-best-selling single of 2008 in Germany.

Track list

Charts

Weekly charts

Year-end charts

References

2008 albums
Sido (rapper) albums
German-language albums